Lorna Tomasone Suafoa (born 7 October 1975 in Auckland, New Zealand) is a former New Zealand international netball representative, who played in the Silver Ferns team that won a silver medal at the 1998 Commonwealth Games in Kuala Lumpur. Since 1998 she has represented Samoa in netball.

References 

Living people
New Zealand netball players
Samoan netball players
Commonwealth Games silver medallists for New Zealand
Netball players from Auckland
1975 births
New Zealand sportspeople of Samoan descent
Commonwealth Games medallists in netball
Netball players at the 1998 Commonwealth Games
1999 World Netball Championships players
Northern Force players
Medallists at the 1998 Commonwealth Games